Bonnots Mill is an unincorporated community in northern Osage County, Missouri, United States. It is located approximately ten miles east of Jefferson City on the Osage River, near its confluence with the Missouri River. The community of Osage City is about four miles to the west-southwest on the Osage and the community of Tebbetts lies across the Missouri River valley to the north.  It has also been known as Dauphine, Bonnets Mills, Bonnots, or Bonnotts Mill.

The community was founded in 1852 by a colony of Missouri French and was named for Felix Bonnot, the owner of a local mill.

The Bonnots Mill Historic District and Dauphine Hotel are listed on the National Register of Historic Places.

References

French-American culture in Missouri
Unincorporated communities in Osage County, Missouri
Jefferson City metropolitan area
Populated places established in 1852
Unincorporated communities in Missouri
1852 establishments in Missouri